

Notes
 There are no members of the House of Commons with military service whose surnames start with
 U
 X
 Z